The Eureka Prizes are awarded annually by the Australian Museum, Sydney, to recognise individuals and organizations who have contributed to science and the understanding of science in Australia. They were founded in 1990 following a suggestion by science journalist Robyn Williams.

Winners

2022

2021

2020

2019

2018

2017

2016

2015

2014
Branka Vucetic, Electrical engineer at the University of Sydney

2013

List of winners:
 CSIRO Eureka Prize for Leadership in Science - Winner: Professor Frank Caruso, University of Melbourne
 Macquarie University Eureka Prize for Outstanding Young Researcher - Winner: Dr Kerrie Wilson, University of Queensland
 University of New South Wales Eureka Prize for Scientific Research - Winner: Dr Lars Kjer-Nielsen and Professor James McCluskey, University of Melbourne, and Professor Jamie Rossjohn, Monash University
 University of New South Wales Eureka Prize for Excellence in Interdisciplinary Scientific Research - Winner: Quantum Bio-probes, University of Melbourne
 University of Sydney Sleek Geeks Science Eureka Prize - Primary – Winner: What is Friction?, Nathan Gori, Reuben Shepherd, Billy McLeod, Jack Dougall and Sacha Balme, Beauty Point Public School, NSW
 Caring for our Country Landcare Eureka Prize for Sustainable Agriculture Winner: The Future Farm Industries CRC Enrich Project Team, CSIRO, University of Western Australia and South Australian Research and Development Institute
 ANSTO Eureka Prize for Innovative Use of Technology - Winner: Zebedee Team, CSIRO
 Australian Government Eureka Prize for Science Journalism Winner: Ian Townsend, ABC
 Australian Government Eureka Prize for Promoting Understanding of Australian Science Research Winner: Professor Rob Brooks University of New South Wales
 NSW Health Jamie Callachor Eureka Prize for Medical Research Translation Winner: Professor Steve Wilton and Professor Sue Fletcher, Murdoch University 
 University of Technology, Sydney Eureka Prize for Outstanding Mentor of Young Researchers - Winner: Professor Rick Shine AM FAA, University of Sydney
 Australian Museum University of Sydney Sleek Geeks Science Eureka Prize – Secondary - Winner: The Spectacular Spider, Brandon Gifford, Casino High School, NSW
 Rio Tinto Eureka Prize for Commercialisation of Innovation - Winner: Scanalyse/Outotec, Scanalyse Pty Ltd/Outotec and Curtin University
 NSW Office of Environment and Heritage Eureka Prize for Environmental Research - Winner: Professor Chris Johnson, University of Tasmania; Dr Michael Letnic, University of New South Wales; Dr Euan Ritchie, Deakin University; Dr Arian Wallach, James Cook University; and Adam O'Neill, Evelyn Downs Station
 New Scientist Eureka Prize for Science Photography - Winner: Richard Wylie, Euakafa Island Research Centre
 Defence Science and Technology Organisation Eureka Prize for Outstanding Science in Safeguarding Australia - Winner: DMTC Armour Applications Program, Defence Materials Technology Centre
 Australian Infectious Diseases Research Centre Eureka Prize for Infectious Diseases Research - Winners: Professor Scott O'Neill, Monash University; Professor Ary Hoffmann, University of Melbourne; Professor Scott Ritchie, James Cook University; Dr Elizabeth McGraw, Monash University; Dr Luciano Moreira, Oswaldo Cruz Foundation; and Professor Brian Kay, Queensland Institute of Medical Research
 3M Eureka Prize for Emerging Leader in Science - Winners: Associate Professor David Wilson, Kirby Institute, University of New South Wales

2012 
List of winners:
 CSIRO Eureka Prize for Leadership in Science - Winner: Professor Suzanne Cory
 Macquarie University Eureka Prize for Outstanding Young Researcher - Winner: Dr Marie-Liesse Asselin-Labat, Walter and Eliza Hall Institute of Medical Research
 University of New South Wales Eureka Prize for Scientific Research - Winners: Professor John Webb, Professor Victor Flambaum, Dr Julian King and Dr Julian Berengut, School of Physics at the University of New South Wales, and Associate Professor Michael Murphy,  Swinburne University of Technology
 University of Sydney Sleek Geeks Science Eureka Prize – Winner:  Brandon Gifford, Year 11 student, Casino High School 
 ANSTO Eureka Prize for Innovative Use of Technology - Winner: Associate Professor Wei Shen with Professor Gil Garnier, Dr Xu Li, Junfei Tian, David Ballerini, Miaosi Li and Lizi Li, Department of Chemical Engineering, Monash University
 Australian Government Eureka Prize for Science Journalism Winners:  Gisela Kaufman and Carsten Orlt, Kaufmann Production
 Australian Government Eureka Prize for Promoting Understanding of Australian Science Research Winner: Dr Rob Brander, School of Biological, Earth and Environmental Sciences, University of NSW
 NSW Health Jamie Callachor Eureka Prize for Medical Research Translation Winner: Professor David Kaye, Heart Failure Research Group, Baker IDI Heart and Diabetes Institute
 University of Technology, Sydney Eureka Prize for Outstanding Mentor of Young Researchers - Winner: Professor Doug Hilton, Walter and Eliza Hall Institute of Medical Research
 Voiceless Eureka Prize for Scientific Research that Contributes to Animal Protection Winner: Professor Clive Phillips, University of Queensland
 Defence Science and Technology Organisation Eureka Prize for Outstanding Science in Support of Defence or National Security - Winner: Dr Yonggang Zhu
 Rio Tinto Eureka Prize for Commercialisation of Innovation - Winner:  Digitalcore, including Dr Victor Pantano, Professor Mark Knackstedt and Professor Tim Senden and Dr Adrian Sheppard, Research School of Physics and Engineering, ANU, and Professor Val Pinczewski and Associate Professor Christoph Arns, School of Petroleum Engineering, UNSW
 NSW Office of Environment and Heritage Eureka Prize for Environmental Research - Winners: Dr Dana Cordell and Professor Stuart White, Institute for Sustainable Futures, University of Technology, Sydney
 Google Australia Eureka Prize for Innovation in Computer Science - Winners: Associate Professor Jon McCormack, Peter McIlwain, Aidan Lane and Dr Alan Dorin, Centre for Electronic Media Art, Faculty of Information Technology, Monash University
 New Scientist Eureka Prize for Science Photography - Winner: Jason Edwards for photograph, "First Documentation of a Humpback Whale Mating"
 Australian Infectious Diseases Research Centre at University of Queensland Eureka Prize for Infectious Diseases Research - Winners:  Dr Marc Pellegrini, with Jesse Toe and Simon Preston, Walter and Eliza Hall Institute of Medical Research
 NSW Trade & Investment Eureka Prize for Science or Mathematics Teaching - Winner: Geoff McNamara, Melrose High School, Pearce, ACT
 3M Eureka Prize for Emerging Leader in Science - Winner: Dr Matthew Hill, CSIRO Materials Science and Engineering

2011
Skeptical Science, founded by John Cook, for contribution to Global Warming research.

2005
 Eureka Prize for Scientific Research: Peter Tuthill for aperture masking interferometry
 Åsa Wahlquist

2001
 John A. Long for Promotion of Science

1997
Penny van Oosterzee won her second Eureka Prize

1995
Ian Plimer, of the University of Melbourne Department of Earth Sciences, author of Telling Lies for God

1994
Dr Barbara Hardy of the Investigator Science and Technology Centre, Adelaide, won the prize for science promotion
Dr Kath Bowmer, deputy chief of CSlRO's Division of Water Resources, for environmental research
Petaluma Wines of South Australia for application of science to wine-making
Dr David Malin, author of A View of the Universe and Mary E. White, author of The Browning of Australia, shared prize

1993
Patricia Vickers-Rich, of Monash University, and Tom Rich, of the Museum of Victoria for their book Wildlife of Gondwana
Professor David Allen, astronomer at the Anglo-Australian Observatory, for science promotion

1992
Questacon, hands-on science demonstrations centre in Canberra won the prize for education
Australian Minerals Industry Research Association of Victoria, won the prize for industry
The coral spawning team led by members of the Museum of Tropical Queensland, Townsville, for environmental research
Professor Paul Davies, for his book The Mind of God

1991
Ben Selinger of ANU, author of Chemistry in the Marketplace
Professor Paul Davies of Adelaide University, author of several best-sellers
Peter Laver of BHP Limited recognizing that company's investment in R&D
Peter Keating of Biotech International, also for investing in R&D
Martin Green, founder and director of the Centre for Photovoltaic Devices and Systems at the University of NSW
Penny Van Oosterzee won the science book prize for The Centre, on Australia's desert regions.

1990
The inaugural Eureka Prize for Industry was awarded by the panel of seven judges to F. H. Faulding for a slow-release form of analgesic.

References

External links
Australian Museum Eureka Prizes 
2019 Winner profiles

Australian science and technology awards
Australian journalism awards